Italo Gariboldi (20 April 1879 – 3 February 1970) was an Italian senior officer in the Royal Army (Regio Esercito) before and during World War II. He was awarded the Knight's Cross of the Iron Cross by German dictator Adolf Hitler for his leadership of Italian forces in the Battle of Stalingrad.

Biography
Gariboldi was born in Lodi, Lombardy.

From the end of World War I and through the interwar Period, Gariboldi rose in the ranks and held various staff, regimental, and brigade level commands.

Abyssinia
In 1935, Gariboldi commanded the 30th Infantry Division "Sabauda" on the northern front during the Second Italo-Abyssinian War. His division was part of the I Corps based in Eritrea. After Italy defeated Ethiopia (Abyssinia) in May 1936, Eritrea, Abyssinia, and Italian Somaliland were joined to form the colony of Italian East Africa on 1 June 1936.

North Africa

From 1939 to 1941, Gariboldi served as an army commander in Marshal Italo Balbo's "Supreme Command – North Africa". When Italy declared war in June 1940, Gariboldi commanded the Italian Fifth Army stationed on the border with French Tunisia. He ultimately commanded both armies located in Libya.  After the Battle of France ended, the Fifth Army became a source of men, parts, and supply for the Italian Tenth Army on the border with Egypt.

In December 1940, when the British launched Operation Compass, Gariboldi was in temporary command of the Tenth Army because General Mario Berti was on sick leave. Ultimately, he was given command of the Tenth Army after it was virtually destroyed and Berti's replacement General Giuseppe Tellera was killed in action.

On 25 March 1941, Gariboldi was promoted to Governor-General of Libya and replaced Marshal Rodolfo Graziani. By 19 July, Gariboldi himself was relieved because of his alleged lack of cooperation with Rommel. General Ettore Bastico took his place.

Russia
From 1942 to 1943, Gariboldi commanded the Italian Army in Russia (Armata Italiana in Russia, or ARMIR, or Italian 8th Army). He was in command of the Italian Army in Russia during the destruction of that army during the Battle of Stalingrad.

Italy
In 1943, Gariboldi was in Italy when King Victor Emmanuel III and Marshal Pietro Badoglio ousted dictator Benito Mussolini and then signed an armistice with the Allies. Like many members of the Italian military, Gariboldi was made a prisoner of war (POW) by the Germans. In 1944, he was sentenced to 10 years in prison as a traitor. Later in 1944, Gariboldi was released from prison by the Allies. He died in Rome in 1970.

His son, Mario Gariboldi, followed his father in a military career.

Military offices held
Chief of Staff of the 77th Division – 1919
Commanding Officer of the 26th Regiment – 1926
Commanding Officer of the 5th Brigade – 1931
Commander of the 30th Infantry Division "Sabauda,", Ethiopia – 1935 to 1936
Commander of the V Corps – 1938 to 1939
Commander of the 5th Army, Tripolitania – 1939 to 1941
Commander of the 10th Army, Cyrenaica – 1941
Governor-General of Italian Libya – 1941
Commander of Italian Army in Russia, southern Russia – 1942 to 1943

See also
 Italian participation in the Eastern Front
 Second Italo-Abyssinian War

References

Citations

Bibliography

External links
 
 Concise biography (in Italian)
 

1879 births
1970 deaths
People from Lodi, Lombardy
Italian military personnel of World War I
Italian military personnel of the Second Italo-Ethiopian War
Italian military personnel of World War II
Italian generals
Italian fascists
Recipients of the Knight's Cross of the Iron Cross
People of former Italian colonies
Governors-General of Italian Libya